Heitor Villa-Lobos (March 5, 1887November 17, 1959) was a Brazilian composer, conductor, cellist, and classical guitarist described as "the single most significant creative figure in 20th-century Brazilian art music". Villa-Lobos has become the best-known South American composer of all time. A prolific composer, he wrote numerous orchestral, chamber, instrumental and vocal works, totaling over 2,000 works by his death in 1959. His music was influenced by both Brazilian folk music and stylistic elements from the European classical tradition, as exemplified by his Bachianas Brasileiras (Brazilian Bachian-pieces) and his Chôros. His Etudes for classical guitar (1929) were dedicated to Andrés Segovia, while his 5 Preludes (1940) were dedicated to his spouse Arminda Neves d'Almeida, a.k.a. "Mindinha". Both are important works in the classical guitar repertory.

Biography

Youth and exploration

Villa-Lobos was born in Rio de Janeiro. His father, Raúl, was a civil servant, an educated man of Spanish extraction, a librarian, and an amateur astronomer and musician.  In Villa-Lobos's early childhood, Brazil underwent a period of social revolution and modernisation, abolishing slavery in 1888 and overthrowing the Empire of Brazil in 1889. The changes in Brazil were reflected in its musical life: previously European music had been the dominant influence, and the courses at the Conservatório de Música were grounded in traditional counterpoint and harmony. Villa-Lobos underwent very little of this formal training. After a few abortive harmony lessons, he learnt music by illicit observation from the top of the stairs of the regular musical evenings at his house arranged by his father. He learned to play cello, clarinet, and classical guitar. When his father died suddenly in 1899 he earned a living for his family by playing in cinema and theatre orchestras in Rio.

Around 1905 Villa-Lobos started explorations of Brazil's "dark interior", absorbing the native Brazilian musical culture. Serious doubt has been cast on some of Villa-Lobos's tales of the decade or so he spent on these expeditions, and about his capture and near escape from cannibals, with some believing them to be fabrications or wildly embellished romanticism. After this period, he gave up any idea of conventional training and instead absorbed the musical influences of Brazil's indigenous cultures, themselves based on Portuguese and African, as well as American Indian elements. His earliest compositions were the result of improvisations on the classical guitar from this period.

Villa-Lobos played with many local Brazilian street-music bands; he was also influenced by the cinema and Ernesto Nazareth's improvised tangos and polkas. For a time Villa-Lobos became a cellist in a Rio opera company, and his early compositions include attempts at Grand Opera. Encouraged by Arthur Napoleão, a pianist and music publisher, he decided to compose seriously.

Brazilian influences

On November 12, 1913, Villa-Lobos married the pianist Lucília Guimarães, ended his travels, and began his career as a serious musician. Up until his marriage, he had not learned to play the piano, so his wife taught him the rudiments of the instrument. His music began to be published in 1913. He introduced some of his compositions in a series of occasional chamber concerts (later also orchestral concerts) from 19151921, mainly in Rio de Janeiro's Salão Nobre do Jornal do Comércio.

The music presented at these concerts shows his coming to terms with the conflicting elements in his experience, and overcoming a crisis of identity, as to whether European or Brazilian music would dominate his style. This was decided by 1916, the year in which he composed the symphonic poems Amazonas and Tédio de alvorada, the first version of what would become Uirapurú (although Amazonas was not performed until 1929, and Uirapurú was only completed in 1934 and first performed in 1935). These works drew from native Brazilian legends and the use of "primitive" folk material.

European influences did still inspire Villa-Lobos. In 1917 Sergei Diaghilev made an impact on tour in Brazil with his Ballets Russes. That year Villa-Lobos also met the French composer Darius Milhaud, who was in Rio as secretary to Paul Claudel at the French Legation. Milhaud brought the music of Claude Debussy, Erik Satie, and possibly Igor Stravinsky; in return Villa-Lobos introduced Milhaud to Brazilian street music. In 1918, he also met the pianist Arthur Rubinstein, who became a lifelong friend and champion; this meeting prompted Villa-Lobos to write more piano music.

In about 1918 Villa-Lobos abandoned the use of opus numbers for his compositions as a constraint to his pioneering spirit. With the piano suite Carnaval das crianças (Children's carnival) of 191920, Villa-Lobos liberated his style altogether from European Romanticism: the suite, in eight movements with the finale written for piano duet, depicts eight characters or scenes from Rio's Lenten Carnival.

In February 1922, a festival of modern art took place in São Paulo and Villa-Lobos contributed performances of his own works. The press were unsympathetic and the audience were not appreciative; their mockery was encouraged by Villa-Lobos's being forced by a foot infection to wear one carpet slipper. The festival ended with Villa-Lobos's Quarteto simbólico, composed as an impression of Brazilian urban life.

In July 1922, Rubinstein gave the first performance of the piano suite A Prole do Bebê (The Baby's Family), composed in 1918. There had recently been an attempted military coup on Copacabana Beach, and places of entertainment had been closed for days; the public possibly wanted something less intellectually demanding, and the piece was booed. Villa-Lobos was philosophical about it, and Rubinstein later reminisced that the composer said, "I am still too good for them." The piece has been called "the first enduring work of Brazilian modernism".

Rubinstein suggested that Villa-Lobos tour abroad, and in 1923 he set out for Paris. His avowed aim was to exhibit his exotic sound world rather than to study. Just before he left he completed his Nonet (for ten players and chorus) which was first performed after his arrival in the French capital. He stayed in Paris in 192324 and 192730, and there he met influential residents including Edgard Varèse, Pablo Picasso, Leopold Stokowski and Aaron Copland. Parisian concerts of his music made a strong impression.

In the 1920s, Villa-Lobos also met the Spanish classical guitarist Andrés Segovia, who commissioned a guitar study: the composer responded by writing a set of twelve such pieces, each based on a tiny detail or figure played by Brazilian itinerant street musicians (chorões), transformed into an étude that is not merely didactic. The music of chorões also provided the initial inspiration for his Chôros, a series of compositions written between 1920 and 1929. The first European performance of Chôros No. 10, in Paris, caused a storm: L.Chevaillier wrote of it in Le Monde musical, "[...it is] an art [...] to which we must now give a new name."

Vargas era

In 1930, Villa-Lobos, who was in Brazil to conduct, planned to return to Paris. One of the consequences of the revolution of that year was that money could no longer be taken out of the country, and so he had no means of paying any rents abroad. Thus forced to stay in Brazil, he arranged concerts instead around São Paulo, and composed patriotic and educational music. In 1932, he became director of the Superintendência de Educação Musical e Artística (SEMA), and his duties included arranging concerts including the Brazilian premieres of Ludwig van Beethoven's Missa Solemnis and Johann Sebastian Bach's Mass in B minor as well as Brazilian compositions. His position at SEMA led him to compose mainly patriotic and propagandist works. His series of Bachianas Brasileiras were a notable exception.

In 1936, at the age of forty-nine, Villa-Lobos left his wife, and became romantically involved with Arminda Neves d'Almeida, who remained his companion until death. Arminda eventually took on the name Villa-Lobos, though Villa-Lobos never divorced his first wife. After Villa-Lobos' death, Arminda became the Director of the Museu Villa-Lobos in 1960, until her death in 1985. Arminda was herself a musician and a significant influence on Villa-Lobos. He also dedicated a good number of works to her, including the Ciclo brasileiro and many of the Chôros.

Villa-Lobos's writings during the presidency of Getúlio Vargas (1930–1945) include propaganda for Brazilian nationhood (brasilidade), and teaching and theoretical works. His Guia Prático ran to 11volumes, Solfejos (two volumes, 1942 and 1946) contained vocal exercises, and Canto Orfeônico (1940 and 1950) contained patriotic songs for schools and for civic occasions. His music for the film O Descobrimento do Brasil (The Discovery of Brazil) of 1936, which included versions of earlier compositions, was arranged into orchestral suites, and includes a depiction of the first mass in Brazil in a setting for double choir.

Villa-Lobos published A Música Nacionalista no Govêrno Getúlio Vargas 1941, in which he characterised the nation as a sacred entity whose symbols (including its flag, motto and national anthem) were inviolable. Villa-Lobos was the chair of a committee whose task was to define a definitive version of the Brazilian national anthem.

After 1937, during the Estado Novo period when Vargas seized power by decree, Villa-Lobos continued producing patriotic works directly accessible to mass audiences. Independence Day on September 7, 1939, involved 30,000 children singing the national anthem and items arranged by Villa-Lobos. For the 1943 celebrations he also composed the ballet Dança da terra, which the authorities deemed unsuitable until it was revised. The 1943 celebrations did include Villa-Lobos's hymn Invocação em defesa da pátria shortly after Brazil's declaring war on Germany and its allies.

Villa-Lobos's status damaged his reputation among certain schools of musicians, among them disciples of new European trends such as serialismwhich was effectively off limits in Brazil until the 1960s. This crisis was, in part, due to some Brazilian composers finding it necessary to reconcile Villa-Lobos's own liberation of Brazilian music from European models in the 1920s with a style of music they felt to be more universal.

Composer in demand

Vargas fell from power in 1945. Villa-Lobos was able, after the end of the war, to travel abroad again; he returned to Paris, and also made regular visits to the United States as well as travelling to Great Britain, and Israel. He received a huge number of commissions, and fulfilled many of them despite failing health. He composed concertos for piano, cello (the second one in 1953), classical guitar (in 1951 for Segovia, who refused to play it until the composer provided a cadenza in 1956), harp (for Nicanor Zabaleta in 1953) and harmonica (for John Sebastian, Sr. in 1955–56). Other commissions included his Symphony No. 11 (for the Boston Symphony Orchestra in 1955), and the opera Yerma (1955–56) based on the play by Federico García Lorca. His prolific output of this period prompted criticisms of note-spinning and banality: critical reactions to his Piano Concerto No. 5 included the comments "bankrupt" and "piano tuners' orgy", "raked the very depths of banality", "nothing ... but soupy textures or a bedraggled romantic idea", and "truly the kind of music that should never get written, still less performed".

His music for the film Green Mansions starring Audrey Hepburn and Anthony Perkins, commissioned by MGM in 1958, earned Villa-Lobos , and he conducted the soundtrack recording himself. The film was in production for many years. Originally to be directed by Vincente Minnelli, it was taken over by Hepburn's husband Mel Ferrer. MGM decided to use only part of Villa-Lobos's music in the actual film, turning instead to Bronisław Kaper for the rest of the music. From the score, Villa-Lobos compiled a work for soprano soloist, male chorus, and orchestra, which he titled Forest of the Amazon and recorded it in 1959 in stereo with Brazilian soprano Bidu Sayão, an unidentified male chorus, and the Symphony of the Air for United Artists Records. The recording was issued both on LP and reel-to-reel tape (United Artist UAC 8007, stereo 7 1/2 IPS).

In June 1959, Villa-Lobos alienated many of his fellow musicians by expressing disillusionment, saying in an interview that Brazil was "dominated by mediocrity". In November he died in Rio; his state funeral was the final major civic event in that city before the capital transferred to Brasília. He is buried in the Cemitério São João Batista in Rio de Janeiro.

Music

His earliest pieces originated in guitar improvisations, for example Panqueca (Pancake) of 1900. The concert series of 191521 included first performances of pieces demonstrating originality and virtuosic technique. Some of these pieces are early examples of elements of importance throughout his œuvre. His attachment to the Iberian Peninsula is demonstrated in Canção Ibéria of 1914 and in orchestral transcriptions of some of Enrique Granados' piano Goyescas (1918, now lost). Other themes that were to recur in his later work include the anguish and despair of the piece Desesperança – Sonata Phantastica e Capricciosa no. 1 (1915), a violin sonata including "histrionic and violently contrasting emotions", the birds of L'oiseau blessé d'une flèche (1913), the mother–child relationship (not usually a happy one in Villa-Lobos's music) in Les mères of 1914, and the flowers of Suíte floral for piano of 191618 which reappeared in Distribuição de flores for flute and classical guitar of 1937.

Reconciling European tradition and Brazilian influences was also an element that bore fruit more formally later. His earliest published work Pequena suíte for cello and piano of 1913 shows a love for the cello, but is not notably Brazilian, although it contains elements that were to resurface later. His three-movement Suíte graciosa of 1915 (expanded to six movements c. 1947 to become his String Quartet No. 1) is influenced by European opera, while Três danças características (africanas e indígenas) of 191416 for piano, later arranged for octet and subsequently orchestrated, is radically influenced by the tribal music of the Caripunas Indians of Mato Grosso.

With his tone poems Amazonas (1917, first performed in Paris in 1929) and Uirapurú (1917, first performed 1935) he created works dominated by indigenous Brazilian influences. The works use Brazilian folk tales and characters, imitations of the sounds of the jungle and its fauna, imitations of the sound of the nose-flute by the violinophone, and not least imitations of the uirapuru bird itself.

His meeting with Arthur Rubinstein in 1918 prompted Villa-Lobos to compose piano music such as Simples coletânea of 1919—which was possibly influenced by Rubinstein's playing of Ravel and Scriabin on his South American tours—and Bailado infernal of 1920. The latter piece includes the tempi and expression markings "vertiginoso e frenético", "infernal" and "mais vivo ainda" (faster still).

Carnaval das crianças of 191920 saw Villa-Lobos's mature style emerge; unconstrained by the use of traditional formulae or any requirement for dramatic tension, the piece at times imitates a mouth organ, children's dances, a harlequinade, and ends with an impression of the carnival parade. This work was orchestrated in 1929 with new linking passages and a new title, Momoprecoce. Naïveté and innocence is also heard in the piano suites A Prole do Bebê (The Baby's Family) of 191821.

Around this time he also fused urban Brazilian influences and impressions, for example in his Quarteto simbólico of 1921. He included the urban street music of the chorões, who were groups containing flute, clarinet and cavaquinho (a Brazilian guitar), and often also including ophicleide, trombones or percussion. Villa-Lobos occasionally joined such bands. Early works showing this influence were incorporated into the Suite populaire brésilienne of 190812 assembled by his publisher, and more mature works include the Sexteto místico (1955, replacing a lost and probably unfinished one begun in 1917), and his setting of the poetry of Mário de Andrade and Catulo da Paxão Cearense in the Canções típicas brasileiras of 1919. His classical guitar studies are also influenced by the music of the chorões.

All the elements mentioned so far are fused in Villa-Lobos's Nonet. Subtitled Impressão rápida do todo o Brasil (A Brief Impression of the Whole of Brazil), the title of the work denotes it as ostensibly chamber music, but it is scored for flute/piccolo, oboe, clarinet, saxophone, bassoon, celesta, harp, piano, a large percussion battery requiring at least two players, and a mixed chorus.

In Paris, his musical vocabulary established, Villa-Lobos solved the problem of his works' form. It was perceived as an incongruity that his Brazilian impressionism should be expressed in the form of quartets and sonatas. He developed new forms to free his imagination from the constraints of conventional musical development such as that required in sonata form. The multi-sectional poema form may be seen in the Suite for Voice and Violin, which is somewhat like a triptych, and the Poema da criança e sua mamã for voice, flute, clarinet, and cello (1923). The extended Rudepoêma for piano, written for Rubinstein, is a multi-layered work, often requiring notation on several staves, and is both experimental and demanding. Wright calls it "the most impressive result" of this formal development. The Ciranda, or Cirandinha is a stylised treatment of simple Brazilian folk melodies in a wide variety of moods. A ciranda is a child's singing game, but Villa-Lobos's treatment in the works he gave this title are sophisticated. Another form was the Chôros. Villa-Lobos composed more than a dozen works with this title for various instruments, mostly in the years 19241929. He described them as "a new form of musical composition", a transformation of the Brazilian music and sounds "by the personality of the composer".

He also composed between 1930 and 1945 nine pieces he called Bachianas Brasileiras (Brazilian Bachian pieces). These take the forms and nationalism of the Chôros, and add the composer's love of Bach. He incorporated neoclassicism in his nationalistic style. Villa-Lobos's use of archaisms was not new (an early example is his Pequena suíte for cello and piano of 1913). The pieces evolved over the period rather than being conceived as a whole, some of them being revised or added to. They contain some of his most popular music, such as No.5 for soprano and eight cellos (19381945), and No.2 for orchestra of 1930 (the Tocata movement of which is Otrenzinho do caipira, "The little train of the Caipira"). They also show the composer's love for the tonal qualities of the cello, both No.1 and No.5 being scored for no other instruments. In these works the often harsh dissonances of his earlier music are less evident: or, as Simon Wright puts it, they are "sweetened". The transformation of Chôros into Bachianas Brasileiras is demonstrated clearly by the comparison of No.6 for flute and bassoon with the earlier Chôros No. 2 for flute and clarinet. The dissonances of the later piece are more controlled, the forward direction of the music easier to discern. Bachianas Brasileiras No.9 takes the concept so far as to be an abstract Prelude and Fugue, a complete distillation of the composer's national influences. Villa-Lobos eventually recorded all nine of these works for EMI in Paris, mostly with the musicians of the French National Orchestra; these were originally issued on LPs and later reissued on CDs. He also recorded the first section of Bachianas Brasileiras No.5 with Bidu Sayão and a group of cellists for Columbia.

During his period at SEMA, Villa-Lobos composed five string quartets, nos. 5to9, which explored avenues opened by his public music that dominated his output. He also wrote more music for Segovia, the Cinq préludes, which also demonstrate a further formalisation of his composition style. After the fall of the Vargas government, Villa-Lobos returned full-time to composition, resuming a prolific rate of completing works. His concertos—particularly those for the classical guitar, the harp, and the harmonica—are examples of his earlier poema form. The Harp Concerto is a large work, and shows a new propensity to focus on a small detail, then to fade it and bring another detail to the foreground. This technique also occurs in his final opera, Yerma, which contains a series of scenes each of which establishes an atmosphere, similarly to the earlier Momoprecoce.

Villa-Lobos's final major work was the music for the film Green Mansions (though in the end, most of his score was replaced with music by Bronisław Kaper) and its arrangement as Floresta do Amazonas for orchestra, as well as some short songs issued separately. In 1957, he wrote a Seventeenth String Quartet, whose austerity of technique and emotional intensity "provide a eulogy to his craft". His Bendita Sabedoria, a sequence of a cappella chorales written in 1958, is a similarly simple setting of Latin biblical texts. These works lack the pictorialism of his more public music.

Except for the lost works, the Nonet, the two concerted works for violin and orchestra, Suite for Piano and Orchestra, a number of the symphonic poems, most of his choral music and all of the operas, his music is well represented on the world's recital and concert stages and on compact disc.

Legacy

When touring Europe with his music he said, "I don't use folklore, I am the folklore" (Eu sou o folclore) and "I have not come to learn, I have come to show what I have done up to now" (Ich bin nicht gekommen, um zu lernen, sondern um zu zeigen, was ich bisher gemacht habe), showing that he was quite aware of his unique position among classical composers, and he made good use of his origins to publicise his own works.

Recordings 
 Villa-Lobos plays Villa-Lobos (SCSH 010, SanCtuS Recordings) (audio)
 Villa-Lobos par lui-même (EMI Classics 0077776722924) (archive from September 26, 2011, accessed November 19, 2015).
 Villa-Lobos: Bachianas Brasileiras Nos. 1, 2, 5 & 9 Angel 0724356696426; EMI Classics CD 724356696457 (archive from September 26, 2011, accessed November 19, 2015). (EMI Classics)
 A database of available Villa-Lobos recordings (archive)

Notes and references
Notes

References

Sources

 
 
 
 
 
 
 
 
 
 
 
 
 
 
 
 {{wikicite|ref=|reference=Villa-Lobos, sua obra: Programa de Ação Cultural, second edition, 1972. Rio de Janeiro: MEC, DAC, Museu Villa-Lobos.}}
 
 

Further reading

 Appleby, David P. 1988. Heitor Villa-Lobos: A Bio-Bibliography. New York: Greenwood Press. .
 Béhague, Gerard. 1994. Villa-Lobos: The Search for Brazil's Musical Soul. Austin: Institute of Latin American Studies, University of Texas at Austin, 1994. .
 Napp, Cornelia. 2010. "Personal representatives" in musikverlegerischen Kulturbeziehungen. Die Vertretung von Heitor Villa-Lobos in den USA. Mit Zeittafel "Villa-Lobos in den USA 1947–1961". Remagen: Max Brockhaus Musikverlag. .
 Peppercorn, Lisa. 1985. "H. Villa-Lobos in Paris". Latin American music review / Revista de musica Latinoamericana 6, no. 2 (Autumn): 235–248.
 Peppercorn, Lisa M. 1989. Villa-Lobos. Edited by Audrey Sampson. Illustrated Lives of the Great Composers. London and New York: Omnibus. .
 Peppercorn, Lisa M. 1991a. Villa-Lobos, the Music: An Analysis of His Style Translated by Stefan De Haan. London: Kahn & Averill; White Plains, New York: Pro/AM Music Resources. .
 Peppercorn, Lisa M. 1996. The World of Villa-Lobos in Pictures and Documents. Aldershot, Hampshire, England: Scolar Press; Brookfield, Vermont: Ashgate Publishers. .
 Villa-Lobos, Heitor. 1994. The Villa-Lobos Letters. Edited, translated, and annotated by Lisa M. Peppercorn. Musicians in Letters, no. 1. Kingston upon Thames: Toccata. .

External links

 Villa-Lobos Museum 
 
 villalobos.iu.edu Villa-Lobos site at Indiana University: Maintained by the Latin American Music Center 
 villalobosproject.com Villa-Lobos: Maintained by Minc
 Peermusic Classical: Heitor Villa-Lobos Composer's Publisher and Bio
 
 Classical Composers Database. Villa-Lobos: Biography.
 "O acorde de Tristão em Villa-Lobos" by Paulo de Tarso Salles. Violão Intercâmbio 12, no. 8 (archive from March 7, 2008, accessed November 19, 2015).
 Heitor Villa-Lobos e o ambiente artístico parisiense: convertendo-se em um músico brasileiro by Paulo Renato Guérios 
 Heitor Villa-Lobos and the Parisian art scene: how to become a Brazilian musician by Paulo Renato Guérios 
 International Jose Guillermo Carrillo Foundation 
 "Villa-Lobos' Guitar Music: Alternative Sources and Implications for Performance ", by Stanley Yates, reprinted from Soundboard, Journal of the Guitar Foundation of America'' 24, no. 1 (Summer 1997): 7–20 (accessed November 19, 2015).
 The Villa-Lobos Magazine: News about Heitor Villa-Lobos on the web and in the Real World.

1887 births
1959 deaths
20th-century classical composers
20th-century guitarists
Ballet composers
Brazilian classical composers
Brazilian classical guitarists
Brazilian male guitarists
Brazilian film score composers
Brazilian opera composers
Brazilian people of Spanish descent
Composers for cello
Composers for harmonica
Composers for the classical guitar
Concert band composers
Male film score composers
Male opera composers
Musicians from Rio de Janeiro (city)
Neoclassical composers
20th-century Brazilian musicians
20th-century male musicians
Burials at Cemitério de São João Batista